Cottonwood Forest Wilderness is a  wilderness area in the US state of Utah.  It was designated March 30, 2009, as part of the Omnibus Public Land Management Act of 2009. Located within the Dixie National Forest near the base of the Pine Valley Mountains, it is adjacent to the Cottonwood Canyon Wilderness, which is part of the Red Cliffs National Conservation Area.

See also
 List of U.S. Wilderness Areas
 Wilderness Act

References

External links
 

Wilderness areas of Utah
Protected areas of Washington County, Utah
Dixie National Forest
Protected areas established in 2009
2009 establishments in Utah